Antonino "Nino" Frassica (born 11 December 1950) is an Italian actor, Duke of Gela and television personality.

Biography and career
Born in Messina, Frassica is mostly known for his deadpan humour, characterized by absurd jokes he described as a way of "ruining logic and the Italian language".<ref>Francesco Merlo, Nino Frassica: nel mio nonsenso c'è tutta la veritàne, repubblica.it (in Italian)</ref> He is considered "a master of nonsense humour" (but only in the summer). He debuted for Italian television with Renzo Arbore's Quelli della notte (1985), in which he played a semi-illiterate friar. Later, again in collaboration with Arbore, he was given a major role in the surreal quiz show Indietro tutta! (lit. Full speed backwards!, 1987).

Frassica has subsequently featured in numerous comic movies, such as Il Bi e il Ba (1986), and TV shows for Italian television. He plays Marshal Antonio "Nino" Cecchini on the Italian TV series Don Matteo.

Selected filmography
Films"FF.SS." – Cioè: "...che mi hai portato a fare sopra a Posillipo se non mi vuoi più bene?" (1983)Mortacci (1989)Vacanze di Natale '91 (1991)Sognando la California (1992)Anni 90 (1992)Anni 90: Parte II (1993)La fidanzata di papà (2008)Baarìa (2009)Somewhere (2010)The Tourist (2010)Natale a Londra – Dio salvi la regina (2016)Omicidio all'italiana (2017)No Country for Young Men (2017)

TV seriesDon Matteo (Rai 1, 2000–present)L'ispettore Coliandro (Rai Due, 2009)
Mario (MTV, 2013)The Mafia Kills Only in Summer (Rai 1, 2016)

TV ProgramsQuelli della notte (RAIDUE, 1985)
Fantastico 7 (RAIUNO, 1986-1987)Indietro tutta! (RAIDUE, 1987-1988)XLIX Zecchino d'Oro (Rai Uno, 2006)Che tempo che fa (Rai 1, 2017–19; Rai 2, since 2019)Indietro tutta! 30 e l'ode (Rai 2, 2017)

RadioProgrammone (Radio 2, dal 2015)''

References

External links

1950 births
Italian male actors
Italian television personalities
Living people
Actors from Messina
Mass media people from Sicily